James Robert Boggio (December 11, 1939–November 6, 1996) was an American accordionist.  He died of heart failure in Cotati, California, aged 56.  A statue of him stands in La Plaza Park, near the center of Cotati.

Career 
Boggio's professional music career began with Frankie Yankovic. He studied music at San Francisco State University.  From 1991 to 1996, he organized the Cotati Accordion Festival. He had a Zydeco/swamp boogie band called the Sonoma Swampdogs and owned a music store called Cotati Accordions.

See also 
 Dawg Duos
 Dan Hicks (singer)

References 

1996 deaths
American accordionists
Musicians from the San Francisco Bay Area
People from Cotati, California
San Francisco State University alumni
1939 births
20th-century American musicians
20th-century accordionists